Rolf Lennart "Riddarn" ("the Knight") Ridderwall (born 20 November 1958) is a retired Swedish ice hockey goaltender. He played for Djurgårdens IF in the Swedish Elite League almost his entire career. Ridderwall won the Golden Puck as the top player in Sweden for the 1989-90 season.

Family
His son, Stefan Ridderwall, is also a hockey goaltender, and his nephew, Calle Ridderwall, is currently playing professional ice hockey in Germany with the Düsseldorfer EG of the Deutsche Eishockey Liga.

References

External links

Rolf Ridderwall Biography and Statistics - Olympics at Sports-Reference.com

1958 births
Living people
AIK IF players
Djurgårdens IF Hockey players
Ice hockey players at the 1984 Winter Olympics
Medalists at the 1984 Winter Olympics
Olympic bronze medalists for Sweden
Olympic ice hockey players of Sweden
Olympic medalists in ice hockey
Ice hockey people from Stockholm
Swedish ice hockey goaltenders